Józef Andrasz (born 16 October 1891 in Wielopole, Nowy Sącz County; died 1 February 1963 in Kraków) was a Polish Roman Catholic priest, writer, translator and editor. A member of the Society of Jesus, he was a confessor of Faustina Kowalska.

Career
Andrasz worked in the Apostleship of Prayer publishing house in Poland (Wydawnictwo Apostolstwa Modlitwy). He was responsible for the publication of 41 volumes in the series The Library of the Internal Life (Biblioteka Życia Wewnętrznego). They were mostly translations of great works on asceticism that he had worked on himself. He was also the editor-in-chief of the popular Catholic paper "The Messenger of the Heart if Jesus" (Posłaniec Serca Jezusowego). He was also national manager of the Apostleship of Prayer and of Catholic Action for Family Consecration -(Dzieło Poświęcenia Rodzin).

While Faustina Kowalska stayed with her order in Kraków, he became her confessor. She mentioned Andrasz many times in her Diary in terms such as follow:

"It is a strange thing that, until I met Father Andrasz, confessors could neither understand me nor set my mind at rest concerning these matters [the revelations]" (p.111), and 
"I am very grateful to the Lord for having given me an enlightened priest" (p. 1596).

Initiation of Divine Mercy
In 1943 Andrasz initiated public devotion to the Divine Mercy in the Divine Mercy Sanctuary (Kraków). The same year, under his direction, a popular version of the Image of Divine Mercy since exhibited in the sanctuary, was painted by Adolf Hyła.

See also
 Michał Sopoćko

References

1891 births
1963 deaths
People from Nowy Sącz County
People from the Kingdom of Galicia and Lodomeria
20th-century Polish Jesuits
Divine Mercy